Lusuku is a town in the Lomami province of the Democratic Republic of the Congo.

Transport 
It is served by a station on the national railway system.

References 

Populated places in Lomami